Alansmia is a genus of ferns in the family Polypodiaceae, subfamily Grammitidoideae, according to the Pteridophyte Phylogeny Group classification of 2016 (PPG I). The genus is mainly native to the Neotropics, with a few species in tropical Africa.

Species
, the Checklist of Ferns and Lycophytes of the World accepted the following species and hybrids:

Alansmia bradeana (Labiak) Moguel & M.Kessler
Alansmia canescens (A.Rojas) Moguel & M.Kessler
Alansmia concinna (A.R.Sm.) Moguel & M.Kessler
Alansmia contacta (Copel.) Moguel & M.Kessler
Alansmia cultrata (Bory ex Willd.) Moguel & M.Kessler
Alansmia dependens (Baker) Moguel & M.Kessler
Alansmia diaphana (Moguel & M.Kessler) Moguel & M.Kessler
Alansmia elastica (Bory ex Willd.) Moguel & M.Kessler
Alansmia esquiveliana (A.Rojas) A.Rojas
Alansmia heteromorpha (Hook. & Grev.) Moguel & M.Kessler
Alansmia immixta (Stolze) Moguel & M.Kessler
Alansmia kirkii (Parris) Moguel & M.Kessler
Alansmia lanigera (Desv.) Moguel & M.Kessler
Alansmia laxa (C.Presl) Moguel & M.Kessler
Alansmia lobulata (A.Rojas) A.Rojas
Alansmia longa (C.Chr.) Moguel & M.Kessler
Alansmia monosora (Moguel & M.Kessler) Moguel & M.Kessler
Alansmia reclinata (Brack.) Moguel & M.Kessler
Alansmia semilunaris (Moguel & M.Kessler) Moguel & M.Kessler
Alansmia senilis (Fée) Moguel & M.Kessler
Alansmia smithii (A.Rojas) Moguel & M.Kessler
Alansmia spathulata (A.R.Sm.) Moguel & M.Kessler
Alansmia stella (Copel.) Moguel & M.Kessler
Alansmia turrialbae (Christ) Moguel & M.Kessler
Alansmia variabilis (Mett. ex Kuhn) Moguel & M.Kessler
Alansmia xanthotrichia (Klotzsch) Moguel & M.Kessler

References

Polypodiaceae
Fern genera